The plain cactus snail, scientific name Xerarionta intercisa, is a species of air-breathing land snail, a terrestrial pulmonate gastropod mollusk in the family Helminthoglyptidae. It is endemic to the United States.

References

Molluscs of the United States
Xerarionta
Gastropods described in 1857
Taxonomy articles created by Polbot